Thomas McCabe (born April 4, 1998) is an American soccer player who currently plays for USL Championship side Detroit City.

Career

Youth and college 
McCabe played three years of college soccer at the University of Notre Dame between 2016 and 2018, making 61 appearances and tallying 4 assists.

While at college, McCabe appeared for USL Premier Development League side Baltimore Bohemians in 2016. He played 341 minutes across 4 appearances and had no goals or assists.

Professional 
On January 11, 2019, McCabe was selected 29th overall in the 2019 MLS SuperDraft by FC Cincinnati. He signed with Cincinnati on February 7, 2019. On February 15, 2019, McCabe joined USL Championship side North Carolina FC on a season-long loan. On May 30, North Carolina FC announced McCabe was being recalled to FC Cincinnati, while also announcing that former NCFC player Nazmi Albadawi was being sent to NCFC on loan.

On August 28, 2020, McCabe was loaned to USL Championship side Memphis 901 for the remainder of the season.

He was released by Cincinnati at the end of their 2020 season. He subsequently signed with USL Championship side Orange County SC on February 10, 2021.

On March 8, 2023, McCabe signed a two-year deal with USL Championship side Detroit City.

References

External links 
 
 Notre Dame bio

1998 births
Living people
American soccer players
Association football midfielders
Baltimore Bohemians players
FC Cincinnati draft picks
FC Cincinnati players
Detroit City FC players
Memphis 901 FC players
North Carolina FC players
Notre Dame Fighting Irish men's soccer players
Orange County SC players
People from South Orange, New Jersey
Soccer players from New Jersey
Sportspeople from Essex County, New Jersey
USL Championship players
USL League Two players